The  was a single-car diesel multiple unit (DMU) train operated by Hokkaido Railway Company (JR Hokkaido) on the Hidaka Main Line in Japan. A single car was built in 1997 by Niigata Tekko (now Niigata Transys) to replace the KiHa 130 DMU car (KiHa 130-5) withdrawn due to collision damage sustained in a level crossing accident in January 1996. From 2007, the unit was rebuilt as an experimental hybrid car, branded "Inno Tech Train", before being finally withdrawn in fiscal 2013.

Design
The design was based on the Tsugaru Railway 21 series DMU built to Niigata's "NDC" lightweight design. As with the KiHa 150-100 cars, the Kiha 160 had inward-opening hopper windows.

When delivered, the unit was originally painted in a similar livery to the KiHa 150-0 units, with light green doors, a light green waistline band, and light purple stripes. From September 1999, it was repainted into a new livery similar to the KiHa 40-350 DMUs transferred to the Hidaka Line on which the KiHa 160 was used.

Internally, the car had fixed 2+1 facing transverse seating bays, with longitudinal bench seating next to the doorways.

History
KiHa 160-1 entered revenue service on the Hidaka Main Line on 1 June 1997, used interchangeably with the KiHa 130 DMUs also used on the line.

In 2007, the unit was rebuilt as an experimental hybrid vehicle using a motor-assisted hybrid system. At the same time, the longitudinal bench seating was replaced with limited-express style transverse seating.

Following the completion of testing, the unit was placed in storage at Naebo Works, before being officially withdrawn in fiscal 2013.

References

External links

 JR Hokkaido KiHa 160 (Japan Railfan Magazine) 

Hokkaido Railway Company
Train-related introductions in 1997
Hybrid multiple units of Japan
Experimental vehicles